2019 Vegalta Sendai season.

Squad 
As of 14 January 2020.

J1 League

League table

Match details

J.League Monthly MVP

Monthly Best Manager

Valuable Player Award 
 Simão Mate

References

External links 

  J.League official site

Vegalta Sendai
Vegalta Sendai seasons